Sophia Antonia Smith (born 18 November 1978) is an American-born Greek retired footballer who played as a midfielder. She has been a member of the Greece women's national team.

Club career
Smith played for Houston Stars in the United States.

International career
Smith played for Greece at senior level in the 2004 Summer Olympics.

See also
 Greece at the 2004 Summer Olympics

References

External links
 
 
 

1978 births
Living people
Women's association football midfielders
Greek women's footballers
Greece women's international footballers
Olympic footballers of Greece
Footballers at the 2004 Summer Olympics
American women's soccer players
Soccer players from Houston
American people of Greek descent
Sportspeople of Greek descent
Citizens of Greece through descent
Cornell Big Red women's soccer players